Béoáed mac Ocláin was bishop of Ardcarne (Ard Carna), County Roscommon.

Béoáed was bishop of Ard Carna in Maigh nAi (now Ardcarne, four miles due east of Boyle, County Roscommon. He is patron saint of Ardcarn, and his feast is celebrated on 8 March.

He was a friend of Saint Caillin.

The poem Imarcaigh sund ar gach saí says of him /that loss was like a fierce loud noise [?].

References

 The History of Mayo to the Close of the Sixteenth Century, Hubert T. Knox, 1908. p. 24

External links
 http://www.ucc.ie/celt/Imarcaigh.pdf
 http://www.cushnieent.force9.co.uk/CelticEra/Saints/saints_donan.htm

6th-century Irish bishops
Medieval saints of Connacht
People from County Roscommon
519 deaths
Year of birth unknown